Eumemmerring College is a former Australian co-educational government school with multiple campuses, and was Victoria's largest government secondary college, and 3rd largest school in Australia.

The college opened as the Hallam High School in February 1971, with only ninety students and five teachers. In 1990, a second campus of the school was established at Fountain Gate, and the name Eumemmerring was chosen for both campuses (named for the creek draining the area occupied by the school). The college also consisted of two campuses in Endeavour Hills; Gleneagles and Endeavour Hills.

In 2008, the decision was made to disaggregate Eumemmerring College into four separate secondary schools, effective as of the 2009 school year.
In 2022, Hallam Senior College will close and a new school encompassing  a year 7-12 curriculum will be on the site under a new name.

Alumni
 Gordon Rich-Phillips, MLC of the Parliament of Victoria since 1999
 Mahe Fonua, former Melbourne Storm NRL player
 Kelma Tuilagi, NRL player

References

Public high schools in Victoria (Australia)
Educational institutions established in 1971
Defunct schools in Victoria (Australia)
1971 establishments in Australia
2008 disestablishments in Australia
Educational institutions disestablished in 2008